Entoloma moongum is a South Australian species of fungus in the large agaric genus Entoloma (subgenus Leptonia). It was described as new to science by mycologist Cheryl Grgurinovic; the original holotype collections were made from Belair National Park in the 1930s by John Burton Cleland, who erroneously referred the fungus to Leptonia lampropus (now Entoloma lampropus).

The spores measure 9.6–13.6 by 5.6–8.4 µm and have 5–6 blunt angles. Basidia (spore-bearing cells) are club-shaped, measuring 34.4–48.8 by 9.6–12.8 µm, with sterigmata up to 6 µm long. The specific epithet derives from the Aboriginal word moonga, meaning "dark".

See also
List of Entoloma species

References

External links
 

Entolomataceae
Fungi described in 1997
Fungi of Australia
Taxa named by Cheryl A. Grgurinovic